In mathematics, a sequence  =  of nonnegative real numbers is called a logarithmically concave sequence, or a log-concave sequence for short, if  holds for .

Remark: some authors (explicitly or not) add two further conditions in the definition of log-concave sequences:
   is non-negative
These conditions mirror the ones required for log-concave functions.

Sequences that fulfill the three conditions are also called Pólya Frequency sequences of order 2 (PF2 sequences). For instance, the sequence  satisfies the concavity inequalities but not the internal zeros condition.

Examples of log-concave sequences are given by the binomial coefficients along any row of Pascal's triangle and the elementary symmetric means of a finite sequence of real numbers.

References

See also
Unimodality
Logarithmically concave function
Logarithmically concave measure

Sequences and series